Carlos Alberto Gamarra Pavón (born 17 February 1971) is a Paraguayan former professional footballer who played as a centre back. He captained the Paraguay national team at international level and was for a long time the most capped player in Paraguayan football history, having made 110 international appearances and scoring 12 goals. Throughout his career, Gamarra was known for his leadership, physical strength, ability in the air, heading accuracy, and outstanding tackling skills, which made him one of the most respected defenders in South America.

Gamarra appeared for the Paraguay national team 110 times, scoring 12 goals, from 1993 to 2006, representing the team at 10 major tournaments and captained the squad during the latter part of his career. He is the second most capped player of the national team, his record being broken by Paulo da Silva in 2013. Gamarra appeared for Paraguay at three FIFA World Cup tournaments (1998, 2002 and 2006), five Copa América tournaments (1993, 1995, 1997, 1999 and 2004), and twice at the Summer Olympic Games (1992 and 2004, with Paraguay claiming Silver Medals in the latter). Gamarra was named as the Paraguayan Footballer of the Year in 1997 and 1998, and was also included in the 1998 FIFA World Cup Team of the Tournament.

Club career
Born in Ypacarai, Gamarra began his club career playing for Cerro Porteño in his home country in 1991, and went on to win the Paraguayan national championship with Cerro in 1992. He moved to Independiente for the 1992–93 football season in Argentina, but stayed only briefly before moving back to Cerro Porteño.

In 1995, Gamarra joined Internacional in Brazil, where his profile grew, eventually resulting in the naming of him as Paraguayan Footballer of the Year in 1997 by the Paraguayan newspaper Diario ABC Color (an achievement which Gamarra repeated in 1998). He moved to S.L. Benfica for the Portuguese 1997–1998 season, before returning to Brazil, this time with SC Corinthians, where he won Serie A Brazilian Championship in 1998.

After finishing the 1999 Brazilian football season with Corinthians, he moved to the Spanish league, playing for Atlético Madrid. Atlético were relegated in 2000, and Gamarra briefly moved back to Brazil, this time joining Flamengo. The 2001–2002 season was more successful for Gamarra, as was loaned AEK Athens in Greece in a transfer record of 5m€ for the club. There he played in 24 league games and won the Greek Cup. He also became a favorite player of the AEK fans.

On the back of his World Cup performance in 2002, he joined Internazionale in Italy's Serie A for the 2002–03 season. In his first pre-season, he scored the winning goal in the Pirelli Cup final against A.S. Roma. Inter finished the season as runners-up in the league, with Gamarra making 14 appearances. His next season at the club was less successful, as Inter finished fourth in the league, and Gamarra made only 10 appearances. He remained at Inter for the 2004–2005 season, but after another season largely spent on the bench he joined the Brazilian side Palmeiras in July 2005. In 2007, Gamarra decided to return to Paraguay to end his football career and signed for Olimpia. Gamarra decided to retire after the 2007 season being Olimpia his last professional club

International career
Gamarra's first international cap came against Bolivia on 27 March 1993, a game which Paraguay lost 2–1. He stayed at Cerro Porteño until 1995.

Gamarra made his first big impact in international football during Paraguay's campaign at 1998 FIFA World Cup, in the second round of which Paraguay were knocked out by France (the eventual winners). Gamarra played in all four of Paraguay's games, garnering great respect for his defensive skills, and did not concede a single foul in any of his side's matches. FIFA named him as part of the All-Star team of the World Cup. At the 2002 FIFA World Cup in South Korea and Japan, Paraguay were once again knocked out in the second round. Gamarra played every single minute of Paraguay's campaign, and again completed his side's participation without conceding a foul.

Gamarra captained the Paraguay side to a silver medal in the football tournament at the 2004 Summer Olympics Olympic Games, losing 1–0 to Argentina in the final. On 4 August, before the Summer Olympics began, he played in a preparation game against the Portugal of Cristiano Ronaldo in the city of Algarve, resulting in a 5–0 defeat.

In the 2006 FIFA World Cup, Gamarra was the first player in the tournament to score an own goal, from an incoming free kick from David Beckham in his team's opening match against England, which eventually led to England's 1–0 win. (Scored after just three minutes, this became the fastest World Cup finals own goal in history, until the 2014 FIFA World Cup where Sead Kolašinac scored just after two minutes playing for Bosnia and Herzegovina against Argentina in the group stages.) During the 2006 FIFA World Cup, Gamarra announced his retirement from the Paraguay national team.

Career statistics

Club

International
Scores and results list Paraguay U23's goal tally first, score column indicates score after each Gamarra goal.

Honours
Cerro Porteño
Paraguayan League: 1990, 1992

Internacional
Campeonato Gaúcho: 1997

Corinthians
Campeonato Brasileiro: 1998
Campeonato Paulista: 1999

Flamengo
Campeonato Carioca: 2001
Copa dos Campeões: 2001

AEK Athens
Greek football Cup: 2002

Internazionale
Coppa Italia: 2005

Paraguay
Silver medal, Olympic Games: 2004

Individual
 El País South America Ideal Team of the Year: 1995, 1996, 1998, 2000, 2005
Paraguayan Footballer of the Year: 1997, 1998
 FIFA World Cup: All-star team 1998
 1998 Best Defender CONMEBOL
 Campeonato Brasileiro Série A Team of the Year: 2005
 Bola de Prata: 1998, 2005

See also
 List of men's footballers with 100 or more international caps
 Players and Records in Paraguayan Football

References

External links
International statistics at rsssf

1971 births
Living people
People from Central Department
Paraguayan footballers
Footballers at the 1992 Summer Olympics
Footballers at the 2004 Summer Olympics
Olympic footballers of Paraguay
Olympic silver medalists for Paraguay
Club Atlético Independiente footballers
Argentine Primera División players
Expatriate footballers in Argentina
Expatriate footballers in Greece
Inter Milan players
Serie A players
Sport Club Corinthians Paulista players
CR Flamengo footballers
Sport Club Internacional players
Sociedade Esportiva Palmeiras players
Campeonato Brasileiro Série A players
Atlético Madrid footballers
La Liga players
S.L. Benfica footballers
Primeira Liga players
AEK Athens F.C. players
Super League Greece players
Club Olimpia footballers
Cerro Porteño players
Paraguayan Primera División players
1998 FIFA World Cup players
1993 Copa América players
1995 Copa América players
1997 Copa América players
1999 Copa América players
2002 FIFA World Cup players
2004 Copa América players
2006 FIFA World Cup players
Association football central defenders
Paraguay international footballers
Paraguayan expatriate footballers
Paraguayan expatriate sportspeople in Argentina
Paraguayan expatriate sportspeople in Italy
Expatriate footballers in Brazil
Expatriate footballers in Spain
Expatriate footballers in Italy
Expatriate footballers in Portugal
Paraguayan expatriate sportspeople in Portugal
Paraguayan expatriate sportspeople in Brazil
Paraguayan expatriate sportspeople in Greece
Paraguayan expatriate sportspeople in Spain
FIFA Century Club
Olympic medalists in football
Medalists at the 2004 Summer Olympics